My Teen Romantic Comedy SNAFU Too! is a 2015 comedy, slice of life Japanese anime based on My Youth Romantic Comedy Is Wrong, as I Expected, the light novels written by Wataru Watari, and the sequel to the first season, which aired in 2013. The students of Soubu High School prepare to go back to their normal lives after the atmosphere of the cultural festival subsides. Hachiman Hikigaya, Yukino Yukinoshita and Yui Yuigahama continue with their responsibility of assisting their fellow peers in the Service Club and soon learn that the Fall season brings with it new social dynamics in the lives of the Soubu teenagers.

The season is produced by Studio feel. and directed by Kei Oikawa, with series composition by Shōtarō Suga, character designs by Yuichi Tanaka, music by Monaca and sound direction by Satoshi Motoyama. The thirteen-episode season premiered on April 3, 2015 and ran until June 26, 2015 on TBS with later airings on MBS, CBC, TUT and BS-TBS. The season was picked up by Crunchyroll for online simulcast streaming in North America and other select parts of the world. This was followed by an acquisition by AnimeLab for an online simulcast in Australia and New Zealand. The season was licensed by Sentai Filmworks for distribution via select digital outlets and a home media release in North America.

The season uses six pieces of theme music: one opening theme, three ending themes and two insert songs. The main ending theme is " by Yukino Yukinoshita (Saori Hayami) and Yui Yuigahama (Nao Tōyama). The ending theme of the fourth episode is " by Yui Yuigahama (Tōyama), which also doubled as the insert song of the thirteenth episode. The ending theme of the seventh episode is "" by Yukino Yukinoshita (Hayami). "Bitter Bitter Sweet" is used as the insert song for the first episode and also performed by Hayami and Tōyama as their respective characters.  by Yanagi is used as the insert song for the tenth episode.



Episode list

Home media
Marvelous! began releasing the series in Japan on seven Blu-ray and DVD volumes between June 24, 2015 and April 28, 2016. Limited Edition Blu-ray volumes  included bonus light novels of the series.

Notes

References

External links
Official anime website 
 
 

My Teen Romantic Comedy SNAFU episode lists
2015 Japanese television seasons